Gustavo Silva Pizarro (1884 — 1960) was a Chilean lawyer, political scientist and the sixth Mayor of the commune of Pichilemu, office which he held for nine years between May 1915 and May 1924.

Biography
Gustavo Silva Pizarro obtained a degree in Law and Political Sciences from the University of Chile on 15 November 1909, subsequently becoming a lawyer.

He married Lucía Silva Henríquez, sister of Catholic Cardinal Raúl Silva Henríquez, with whom he had nine children: Raúl, Lucía, Teresa, Patricio, Enrique, Ricardo, Bernardo (married with Mónica Donoso Flores), Andrés (married with Yolanda Oelkers Robles), and Mercedes (married with Hugo Donoso Donoso).

Political career and mayorship of Pichilemu
Gustavo Silva Pizarro was elected mayor (primer alcalde) of Pichilemu in 1915 for a three-year term, and re-elected for the 1918–21 and 1921–24 terms. In the 1924 election, Luis Barahona Fornés was elected mayor and Silva Pizarro was relegated to a regidor office for the 1924–1927 term.

During Silva Pizarro's tenure as mayor of Pichilemu, on 2 January 1919, the municipality contracted for the first time a doctor, Joaquín Browne, to provide health services for the commune.

Works
 Estudio sobre la institución jurídica de los retractos (1909), Impr. y Enc. Victoria

References

1884 births
1960 deaths
Mayors of Pichilemu
Chilean political scientists
University of Chile alumni
20th-century Chilean lawyers
20th-century political scientists